Bernard Antony (born 28 November 1944) is a French politician. He served as a Member of the European Parliament (MEP) from 1984 to 1999.

Antony is the president of the General Alliance against Racism and for Respect for French and Christian Identity. He is a Traditionalist Catholic.

References

Living people
1944 births
MEPs for France 1989–1994
People from Tarbes
National Rally (France) MEPs
National Rally (France) politicians
French traditionalist Catholics